Timba Harris (born September 21, 1977) is a violinist, violist, trumpet player, and composer.  He is an active touring and recording member of Trey Spruance's Secret Chiefs 3, a founding member of the band Estradasphere, and one half of the electroacoustic chamber duo Probosci. His large ensemble works have been recorded for John Zorn's Tzadik Records, and his playing and orchestral arrangements can be found on recordings throughout the experimental rock world and on video games and film. Harris has performed in theaters, halls, clubs, and festivals in over 45 countries throughout North America, South America, Europe, the Middle East, Asia, and Australia. He has been based in several locations during his career, including Los Angeles, Santa Cruz, Seattle, New York, England, and France.

Biography

Early life 

Timothy "Timba" Bruce Harris was born in 1977 in Burbank, California. During his childhood and teenage years, he studied and performed classical music, percussion, wind ensemble music and played iconic rock clubs on the Sunset Strip in Hollywood with his heavy metal band Insanity.

From 1995 to 2000, he attended the University of California, Santa Cruz, studying trumpet performance and violin performance, the latter under Roy Malan.  Here he formed the band Estradasphere with schoolmates, which became his first international touring ensemble and led to working relationships with the larger professional worlds of contemporary classical music, avant-garde jazz, and experimental rock.

Bands and ensembles 

Timba Harris is a longtime multi-instrumentalist in Trey Spruance's musical exploration into mysticism, Secret Chiefs 3, an offshoot of Mr. Bungle. Since performing with the band during a US tour with Harris's band Estradasphere in the summer of 2000, he has been a perpetual presence on Secret Chiefs 3's recordings and in performances, including the Xaphan: Book of Angels Volume 9 ensemble, which performs and records interpretations of John Zorn's Masada music.

Estradasphere, formed in 1999, toured the US and Europe during the 2000s. They released several recordings and movies on Mimicry Records and The End Records before disbanding in 2009.  In 2007, the band met Amanda Palmer (of the Dresden Dolls) and collaborated on Palmer's projects  including her 2007 album Who Killed Amanda Palmer and her duo with Jason Webley, Evelyn Evelyn, culminating in an invite-only, multi-day live performance at the band's Seattle compound.

Harris's work, beginning in the mid-2000s, with composer and guitarist Gyan Riley (son of the American composer Terry Riley) in the Gyan Riley Trio, first with drummer Scott Amendola and then Ches Smith, led to an enduring musical relationship with Riley, which in 2014 became a duo named Probosci. The duo, comprised of Harris and Riley, composes pieces for each other, which are then performed electro-acoustically on violin and classical/electric guitar. Since 2014, the group has performed throughout North America, South America, and Europe, and released their first recording, Time to Feed, on Mimicry Records.

After becoming involved with the New York Arabic Orchestra in 2012, both as a performer and an administrator, Harris subsequently formed Arabic/rock fusion band Al Madar with the NYAO's directors, Lebanese multi-instrumentalist Basam Saba and percussionist April Centrone. Al Madar has performed at the Beirut Jazz Festival in Lebanon, the Sines Festival Músicas do Mundo in Portugal, and Joe's Pub in Manhattan.

Other work as a performer 

Timba Harris has appeared frequently with the contemporary music ensemble New Music Works in Santa Cruz, California.  As "guest artist" and "featured artist," he has performed NMW director Phil Collins live music scores for Metropolis and Nosferatu, as well as the world premiere of Harris's own composition, neXus I: Cascadia with the New Music Works ensemble and the Ariose Singers.

Harris toured and recorded with the Seattle-based band led by Randall Dunn, Master Musicians of Bukkake, during their Totem Trilogy era (2009-2011).

Solo work / composition styles 

Timba Harris's composition neXus I: Cascadia (2011), for choir and electroacoustic instrumental ensemble, is a "musical representation of the natural environment of the Pacific Northwest with a focus on transitional processes." The musical narrative focuses on the life cycle of the monarch butterfly, the seasonal behavior of the black bear, and the eruption of Mount Saint Helens. The 45-minute piece is a set of compositions and controlled improvisations informed by data concerning the subject matter and recorded and composed in a back-and-forth process that defined the ultimate musical result.  The choral movements were recorded by the 85-member CSULB University Choir under the baton of Dr. Jonathan Talberg.

Harris other compositional and playing styles make use of elements of Arabic, Romanian, contemporary classical, and rock music. An essay written by Harris on this subject was published in John Zorn's Arcana III: Musicians on Music (2008).

Timba Harris composes and records solo, chamber, and large ensemble collaborations with other artists such as Eyvind Kang, Stephen O'Malley (Ensemble Pearl) and Grails.

Other recordings 

As a session musician and performer, Harris has also contributed to composers' work such as John Zorn, Peter Garland, Eyvind Kang, and Toby Driver. He appears on recordings by Mr. Bungle, Amanda Palmer, and several projects produced by Randall Dunn, including albums by Wolves in the Throne Room and Sunn O))). He also provided the violin and trumpet performances on the soundtracks for the popular Valve video games Left 4 Dead 2 and Team Fortress 2.

Discography

Timba Harris 
neXus I: Cascadia (2012) Tzadik Records

Probosci 
Time to Feed (2014) Mimicry Records

Secret Chiefs 3 

Ishraqiyun: Perichoresis (2014) Mimicry Records
FORMS: Apocryphon of Jupiter / Danse Macabre (2014) Mimicry Records
UR: Medium Aevum / FORMS: Stars and Stripes Forever (2014) Mimicry Records
Book of Souls: Folio A (2013) Mimicry Records
La Chanson de Jacky / The Western Exile (2012) Mimicry Records
Satellite Supersonic (2010) Mimicry Records
Traditionalists: Le Mani Destre Recise Degli Ultimi Uomini (2009) Mimicry Records
DVD: Live at the Great American Music Hall (2009) Mimicry Records
Xaphan: Book of Angels Volume 9 (2008) Tzadik Records
Ishraqiyun: Balance of the 19 (2007) Mimicry Records
Electromagnetic Azoth: The Left Hand of Nothingness (2007) Mimicry Records
Path of Most Resistance (2007) Mimicry Records
Book of Horizons (2004) Mimicry Records
Book M (2001) Mimicry Records

Estradasphere 
The Pegasus Vault EP (2008) Lobefood
DVD: Palace of Mirrors Live (2007) the End Records
Palace of Mirrors (2006) the End Records
DVD: These are the Days (2005)
DVD: Passion for Life (2004) Mimicry Records
Quadropus (2003) Mimicry Records
Buck Fever (2001) Mimicry Records
The Silent Elk of Yesterday (2001) Mimicry Records
It's Understood (2000) Mimicry Records

With others 
Alora Crucible Thymiamatascension (2021) House of Mythology
Atomic Ape Swarm (2014) Mimicry Records
Toby Driver Ichneumonidae (2014)
Grails Black Tar Prophecies Vol. 4, 5, and 6 (2013) Temporary Residence
Ensemble Pearl Ensemble Pearl (2012) Drag City
Eyvind Kang Grass (2012) Tzadik Records
Eyvind Kang Visible Breath (2012) Ideologic Organ
Master Musicians of Bukakke Totem 3 (2011) Important Records
Grails Deep Politics (2011) Temporary Residence Limited
Wolves in the Throne Room Celestial Lineage (2011) Southern Lord
Cave Singers No Witch (2011) JagJaguwar Records
Mamiffer Mare Decendrii (2011) Conspiracy Records
Jason Webley In This Light: Live at Bear Creek (2011) 11 Records
Master Musicians of Bukakke Totem 2 (2010) Important Records
Grails Black Tar Prophecies Volume 4 (2010) Important Records
Evelyn Evelyn Evelyn Evelyn (2010) 8 Ft. Records, 11 Records
Master Musicians of Bukakke Totem 1 (2009) Conspiracy Records
SunnO))) Monoliths and Dimensions (2009) Southern Lord
Orange Tulip Conspiracy Orange Tulip Conspiracy (2008) Mimicry Records
Thanato/Schizo Zoom Code (2008) My Kingdom Music
Vladimir Bozar 'n' ze Sharaf Orkestar Universal Sprache (2008) Imago Records
Peter Garland Love Songs (2005) Tzadik Records
Impaled Death After Life (2005) Century Media
Tuna Helpers I'll Have What She's Having (2005) Mimicry Records
ISS Forget About the Girl (2002) Mimicry Records
Mr. Bungle California (1999) Warner Brothers

Film 
Starslyderz (2005) Funny Farm Films, Java Bob Films
Queen of the Sun: What are the Bees Telling Us? (2011) Lush Mechanique Music

Video games 
Left 4 Dead 2 (2009) Valve
Team Fortress 2 (2009) Valve

References

External links

1977 births
Living people
American male composers
21st-century American composers
American trumpeters
American male trumpeters
American male violinists
American violists
21st-century trumpeters
21st-century American violinists
21st-century American male musicians
21st-century violists